The Alvis Three Litre Series III sports saloon or drophead coupé, also known as TE 21, is an automobile produced by English manufacturer Alvis between 1963 and 1966 with a body built by Mulliner Park Ward. It was an updated version of the 1958 TD21.

Description
The body was a modified version of the TC 108G styled by Graber of Switzerland but built by Mulliner Park Ward and distinguished by having twin headlights mounted one above the other. Saloon and drophead versions were available.  The design was noted for its lack of bright side trim or creases moulded into the body parts.  The windshield was one-piece, curved, and not too highly sloped.

A choice of automatic or five speed gearbox made by ZF was available. Suspension was independent at the front using coil springs, with leaf springs at the rear. Disc brakes were fitted to all wheels.

Recirculating-ball-type steering gear was fitted to reduce effort and power steering became optional in late 1964.

Although the car was replaced by the TF 21 in 1966, the TE 21 was still in stock and "available to special order" until 1967.

Specifications (1966 Model 3-litre Series III Saloon)
Engine
Maximum speed: over 

Chassis/body
Overall length:  15.708 ft (4.788 m)
Overall width:    5.500 ft (1.676 m)
Height:           5.000 ft (1.524 m)
Turning circle:  39.000 ft (11.88 m)
Wheelbase:        9.292 ft (2.832 m)
Front track:      4.635 ft (1.413 m)
Rear track:       4.510 ft (1.375 m)
Fuel tank capacity:  
Empty weight:    2,900 pounds (1315 kg) approximately

Graber Switzerland

Carrosserie Hermann Graber continued to build their own bodies on the Alvis chassis.

References

Further reading

External links

TE21
Cars introduced in 1963